The  is a mid-size/large family car built in Derbyshire, United Kingdom by the Japanese automaker Toyota from October 1997 to August 2018. It was the direct successor to the European Carina E and was available as a four-door saloon, five-door liftback and estate.

The Avensis was introduced in 1997, to create a more modern name when compared with the Carina E. The "Avensis" name is derived from the French term avancer, meaning "to advance" or "move forward". The Avensis was not sold in North America, and it is related to the Scion tC coupé. It also shared a platform with the Allion and Premio and was available at Japanese dealership network Toyota Netz Store.

An MPV called the Avensis Verso (Ipsum in Japan and previously the Picnic in other markets) was built in Japan on a separate platform. 



First generation (T220; 1997) 

Toyota introduced the Avensis nameplate on its new model, which was launched at the end of 1997. Although an extensive revamp of the previous generation Carina E, the only main common parts were the engines, with an all new style of body. The car was built at the Burnaston factory in Derby. At the same time, production of the five-door Toyota Corolla also started at the British plant.

The first generation Avensis had the option of four engines (1.6-, 1.8- and 2.0-litre petrol and a 2.0-litre turbo-diesel) and three body styles (saloon, hatchback and estate). The station wagon was essentially the Japanese-market second generation Toyota Caldina. All of the range gave solid build quality, excellent reliability, a spacious comfortable interior, generous equipment, smooth ride quality and good refinement, but very little in the way of excitement.

The first generation Avensis received a facelift in August 2000. The engines were fitted with variable valve timing, satellite navigation was included as a standard feature along the range and the sporty Avensis 2.0 L SR (with body kit and tuned suspension) was added but overall sales remained low.

The first generation Avensis was also sold in South America. In Argentina and Brazil, it was sold as the Toyota Corona (as seen on brochures), but in Chile and Peru, it was sold as the Corona Avensis. In Greece, the Toyota Corona model name had long been synonymous with "taxi", so Avensis' sold for taxi use received "Toyota Corona" badging until the 2000 facelift. Models for private use and post-facelift taxis were Avensis, just like in the rest of Europe.

Engines

Petrol 
1.6-litre 4A-FE 
1.6-litre VVT-i 3ZZ-FE 
1.8-litre 7A-FE 
1.8-litre VVT-i 1ZZ-FE 
2.0-litre 3S-FE 
2.0-litre D4 VVT-i 1AZ-FSE

Diesel 
2.0-litre TD 2C-TE 
2.0-litre D-4D 1CD-FTV

Second generation (T250; 2003) 

The second generation Avensis was launched in February 2003, in an all new format; this time it offered more in the way of driver involvement and visual appeal. It was launched in Japan in saloon and estate form in October 2003, replacing the V50 series Vista and Vista Ardeo. Like the Echo/Yaris and Corolla, it was penned by the company's design studio in France. Production officially began on 6 January 2003. Following the withdrawal of the Camry in 2004 (2005 in Switzerland), the Avensis became the largest Toyota saloon sold in Western Europe.

Trim levels in the United Kingdom were T2, T3-S, T3-X, T4, T Spirit, T180 and TR. There is also a special edition, based on the T2 called the Colour Collection. In Ireland, there were five trim levels – Terra, Aura, Strata, Luna and Sol. In Japan, the Avensis is sold as 2.0 Xi, 2.0 Li (later replaced by 2.4 Li) and 2.4 Qi. Only the base model 2.0 Xi is offered with four-wheel drive.

This is first and only generation of Avensis sold in Egypt and Morocco, not in Persian Gulf countries.

In the 2004 European Car of the Year contest, the Avensis came in fourth place behind the Fiat Panda (winner), Mazda3 (second) and the Volkswagen Golf (third). However, it won the 2004 Semperit Irish Car of the Year. What Car? also awarded the Avensis as the "Best Family Car" for 2004 and 2005.

Facelift 
In 2006, the Avensis received a mid-career facelift. Exterior cosmetic changes include a slightly redesigned logo, a new front grille with double concave lines (including a new darker grille treatment on higher trim levels), new headlamps and rear combination lamps, revised front bumpers and front fog lights, door mirror with turn signals adoption, new tyres, a new wheel design (in two colours) and a new wheel cap design, and five changed body colours. Toyota describes the cosmetic changes as strengthening the family connection with the Corolla and Yaris, and allowing the Avensis to maintain a premium look while giving it a sportier appearance.

Inside, the dashboard materials are revised, the beige interior is replaced by a new grege interior, the instrumentation is revised, the design of the switches is changed, the passenger seat is now height adjustable, alcantara seats are available, and the seats become 60:40 split folding. The Hi-Fi, which previously had a CD and tape player, now only accepts CDs but also plays MP3s. The central screen containing the information of the on-board computer has been removed in favour of a compartment (as on the previous entry-level) and is now integrated into the meters facing the driver.

From a structural point of view, the underbody is reinforced. Finally, the 2.0L D4D  diesel engine is replaced by the 2.0L D4D  engine. This, coupled to a six-speed manual gearbox, has lowered fuel consumption, emissions, and gives a quoted  time of 10.5 seconds.

Safety 
In 2003, the Avensis became the first Japanese vehicle to receive a five-star rating under the Euro NCAP's redone testing, with 34 total points it also became the highest rated vehicle they had tested. In 2003, the Avensis also became the first vehicle sold in Europe with a knee airbag.

Engines 
The 1.6-, 1.8- and 2.0-litre petrol and 2.0-litre turbo-diesel engines were carried over from the previous Avensis, and the 2.4-litre four-cylinder from the Camry was also added to the range. This was the first Avensis to be exported to Japan. Due to the Camry Wagon ending production, the Avensis Wagon is exported to New Zealand, in both 1.8- and 2.0-litre forms. In the United Kingdom, there were no 1.6-litre versions available.

The original 115 PS (85 kW) D-4D diesel engine has been complemented with a 2.2 L D-4D in 136 PS (2AD-FTV) and 177 PS (2AD-FHV) versions. Newer versions have dropped the "D-4D" and "2.0" badging from the front wings and tailgate respectively.

From 2005, the 2.4 L version was fitted with a 5-speed automatic transmission.

Petrol 
1.6-litre VVT-i 3ZZ-FE 
1.8-litre VVT-i 1ZZ-FE 
2.0-litre VVT-i 1AZ-FSE 
2.4-litre VVT-i 2AZ-FSE

Diesel 
2.0-litre D-4D 1CD-FTV 
2.0-litre D-4D 1AD-FTV 
2.2-litre D-4D 2AD-FTV 
2.2-litre D-Cat 2AD-FHV

Third generation (T270; 2009) 

The third generation Avensis was revealed at the 2008 Paris Motor Show. It went on sale in January 2009. Like the previous model, it is built at Toyota's Burnaston plant in Derbyshire, England. This generation is available in saloon or estate styles only. The third generation Avensis full-year sales goal was of 115,000 vehicles.

Toyota ED2 initially designed the Avensis giving it a more sleek and athletic stance. Other design goals were to create the most comfortable suspension in its class while still offering sporty handling. The Avensis continued to use front MacPherson struts and rear double wishbones. Unlike the previous generation Avensis models, there is no five door hatchback body style in this lineup, in favour of saloon and estate body styles.

Major options include bi xenon HID headlamps, Adaptive Front-lighting System (AFS), and adaptive cruise control.

The Avensis wagon began being imported again to Japan in mid-2011, with 2.0-litre 4-cylinder engine and CVT transmission in Li and Xi variants. The Avensis wagon was discontinued in Japan on 27 April 2018.

First facelift (2012–2015) 
The Avensis underwent a facelift in January 2012. This included a revised front grille and modified tail lamps. The changes were first shown in September 2011 at the Frankfurt Motor Show before sales started in January 2012.

Second facelift (2015–2018) 
A further facelift was shown in March 2015 at the Geneva Motor Show. The facelifted vehicle was officially launched in June 2015. This included a revised front grille, rear view, headlamps and taillamps and a new interior. In addition to the new "Toyota Safety Sense", new engines were also shown. The 1.6-litre diesel replaces the previous 2.0-litre engine.

Safety 
For safety, seven airbags are standard, including two front row side torso airbags, two side curtain airbags for both rows, and a driver's knee airbag. For rear collisions, active front headrests designed to help reduce whiplash are standard as well as brake lamps that flash under emergency braking. Vehicle Stability Control+ (VSC+) applies torque to the steering wheel to aid the driver in steering. A Pre-Collision System (PCS) becomes optional which includes Lane Departure Warning (LDW) and Lane Keeping Assist (LKA).

The Avensis received a five-star rating under the latest Euro NCAP ratings scheme with an 81% overall score and a 90% score for adult occupant safety.

Engines 
The Avensis offers three petrol and four diesel engine options. Petrol engines are sourced from Toyota's Deeside Engine Plant. The new engines feature more power and lower  emissions. The new ZR engines became the first to introduce Toyota's Valvematic technology.

Petrol 
1.6-litre 1ZR-FAE  2008–2018
1.8-litre 2ZR-FAE  2008–2018
2.0-litre 3ZR-FAE  2008–2018, 2008–2011 (Germany)

Diesel 
1.6-litre D-4D 1WW  2015–2017
2.0-litre D-4D 1AD-FTV  2011–2015
2.0-litre D-4D 1AD-FTV  2008–2011
2.0-litre D-4D 2WW  2015–2018
2.2-litre D-4D 2AD-FTV  2008–2015
2.2-litre D-4D 2AD-FHV  2008–2015
All engines are mated to a six-speed manual transmission while the 1.8 L and 2.0 L petrol engines are available with a Multidrive S CVT transmission. The 2.2-litre D-4D 150 hp engine is available with a six-speed automatic transmission.

Motorsports 

On 2 August 2010, it was announced the British Touring Car Championship's NGTC prototype car would be built around the Toyota Avensis.

Series organiser TOCA, which would fully introduce the new low-cost NGTC technical regulations in 2011, said that the Japanese manufacturer would supply a donor car and a new body shell to the programme. The Avensis was used by Speedworks Motorsport, driven by Tom Ingram, until the end of the 2018 season.

Discontinuation 
The Avensis was discontinued in the United Kingdom in August 2018 and across Europe in late 2018. It was replaced by the slightly larger XV70 series Camry, which is based on the TNGA-K platform.

Nameplate usage for other models

Avensis Verso 

The Avensis Verso was a large MPV introduced in 2001 using the Avensis nameplate, with room for seven occupants and only initially available with 2.0-litre engines. The Avensis Verso's platform preceded the second generation model. The Avensis Verso was the back-to-back winner of Australia's Best People Mover award in 2002 and 2003. The Avensis Verso continued to be available alongside the second-generation Avensis until 2006.

References

External links 

Cars introduced in 1997
2000s cars
2010s cars
All-wheel-drive vehicles
Cars of England
Euro NCAP large family cars
Front-wheel-drive vehicles
Hatchbacks
Mid-size cars
Sedans
Station wagons
Touring cars
Avensis
Vehicles with CVT transmission